Lazarus or ,  689, is an unfinished 1820 oratorio by Franz Schubert on a libretto by August Hermann Niemeyer. Intended to be in three acts, only act 1 with twenty-one numbers, and eight numbers from act 2 are extant.

Structure
The work is for three sopranos, two tenors, bass, mixed choir and orchestra.

Act 1
Act 2

Roles
Maria  (soprano) 
Martha (soprano) 
Jemina (soprano) 
Lazarus (tenor) 
Nathanael  (tenor) 
Ein Jüngling (tenor) 
Simon Peter (bass)

Recordings
1978 – Carola Nossek, Ursula Reinhardt-Kiss, Ingeborg Springer, Eberhard Büchner, Horit Gebhardt. Staatskapelle Berlin Dietrich Knothe recorded in the Christuskirche, Berlin Berlin Classics 94452BC; reissued 1 CD Brilliant Classics
1981 – (also Mass No. 2 in G, D 167), Theodor Guschlbauer Warner Apex 2008
1983 – Edith Mathis, Wulkopf, Schwarz, Hollweg, Laubenthal,  Hermann Prey conducted , Orfeo 2LP
1983 -  Lucia Popp, Robert Tear, Helen Donath, Maria Venuti, Josef Protschka, Dietrich Fischer-Dieskau, Chor Des Bayerischen Rundfunks, Symphonie-Orchester Des Bayerischen Rundfunks, Wolfgang Sawallisch, EMI Classics
1996 – completed by Edison Denisov. Rubens, Nylund, Nold, Weir. Bach Collegium Stuttgart, Helmuth Rilling Hanssler 1996, also reissued 2 CD Brilliant Classics 99969
1997 – Concentus Musicus Wien, Dorothea Röschmann, soprano; Ľuba Orgonášová, soprano; Elisabeth von Magnus, mezzo-soprano; Herbert Lippert, tenor; Reinaldo Macias, tenor; Raimund Nolte, baritone. Arnold Schoenberg Choir, conductor Nikolaus Harnoncourt Classics
2013 – Sarah Wegener, Johanna Winkel, Sophie Harmsen, Andreas Weller, Kammerchor Stuttgart, Hofkapelle Stuttgart, Frieder Bernius 1CD Carus

References

Sources
 New Schubert Edition, Series II: Stage Works, Vol.10 – Lazarus oder die Feier der Auferstehung D 689: Fragment eines religiösen Dramas in 3 Akten. Edited by Reinhold Kubik. 1987.

External links
 

Compositions by Franz Schubert
Church music by Franz Schubert
1820 compositions
Oratorios
Oratorios based on the Bible
German-language oratorios